Niels Vogt may refer to:
 Niels Nielsen Vogt,Norwegian priest and politician
 Niels Petersen Vogt, Norwegian civil servant and politician